Paris '99: "Anthony, Are You Around?" is a live album by the slowcore group Low, released in 2001. It was recorded live at La Maroquinerie, Paris, on November 5, 1999.

Track listing
"Home" – 3:43
"Starfire" – 3:26
"No Need" – 4:00
"Weight of Water" – 5:11
"Immune" – 3:48
"Rope" – 7:12
"Two-Step" – 6:26
"Violence" – 5:51
"Blue Christmas" – 4:08
"Over the Ocean" – 4:04
"Hey Chicago" – 2:41
"Joan of Arc" – 3:33
"Soon" – 8:03
"I Remember" – 5:57
"Lazy" – 6:06
"Will the Night" – 3:28

References

Low (band) live albums
2001 live albums